Center Square is an unincorporated community in Whitpain Township, Montgomery County, Pennsylvania, United States, at the junction of U.S. Route 202 and Pennsylvania Route 73. The Stony Creek drains the community, into the Schuylkill River in Norristown. It is served by the Wissahickon School District and by the Blue Bell post office, with the ZIP code of 19422.

References

Unincorporated communities in Montgomery County, Pennsylvania
Unincorporated communities in Pennsylvania